David "Dave" Venable (born January 11, 1978) is a former intelligence officer with the United States National Security Agency, and current cyber security professional and businessman. He is an author and speaker on the topics of cyber security, cyberwarfare, and international security; has developed security-related internet protocols; is a US patent holder; and has been named as one of the most influential people in security.

Early life and education
Venable was born in and grew up in Little Rock, Arkansas, and later attended the University of Arkansas, majoring in mathematics.  After college, he joined the United States Air Force and studied Korean at the Defense Language Institute in Monterey, California, a Department of Defense educational and research institution which provides linguistic and cultural instruction to the DoD and other Federal Agencies. Venable has also pursued graduate education in mathematics at the University of Texas, and international relations at Harvard University.

Career
Until 2005 Venable served in several intelligence roles with the National Security Agency, including Computer Network Exploitation, Cyberwarfare, Information Operations, and Digital Network Intelligence in support of global anti-terrorism operations. He has also taught about these subjects while serving as adjunct faculty at the National Cryptologic School, a school within the National Security Agency that provides training to members of the United States Intelligence Community.

After leaving federal service Venable founded and served as CEO of Vanda Security, a Dallas-based security consultancy, which ultimately became the security professional services practice of Comcast Business Masergy, where he served as CISO for eight years.  Venable regularly speaks at industry and government conferences including Black Hat Briefings and the Warsaw Security Forum, serves as a cyber security expert with think tanks and policy research institutes, serves on The Colony, Texas technology board, and is a cybersecurity expert and speaker with the United States Department of State.

Bibliography
Venable frequently contributes to and appears in Forbes, BBC, Harvard Business Review, Bloomberg Businessweek, InformationWeek, IDG Connect, and other media outlets in matters pertaining to cyber security, cyberwarfare, and international security.

Patents

References 

1978 births
Living people
American technology writers
People associated with computer security
Writers from Little Rock, Arkansas
Businesspeople from Little Rock, Arkansas
Military personnel from Little Rock, Arkansas
National Security Agency people
United States Air Force airmen
Defense Language Institute alumni
University of Texas alumni
Harvard Graduate School of Arts and Sciences alumni
American technology chief executives